Abdul Illal Osumanu (born 20 August 1996) is a Ghanaian footballer who last played as a defender for Union Omaha in USL League One.

Career

College and amateur career 
Osumanu first attended and played for the Charleston Golden Eagles in 2016. While there he was an instrumental player in a team that won an MEC Championship and played in the NCAA Division II Men's Soccer Championship, overall he made 17 appearances and scored one goal for the team. After his freshman season, he transferred to NCAA Division I school, the Marshall Thundering Herd, a team 45 minutes away from Charleston, West Virginia in Huntington, West Virginia.  During his three years at Marshall University, Osumanu played in 59 games and scored two goals. During his senior season, he was an instrumental piece in a historic Marshall side that won the 2019 Conference USA Men's Soccer Tournament and made it to NCAA Division I Men's Soccer Tournament for the first time.

While playing in college, Osumanu further played for two teams in USL League Two, these teams were the West Virginia Chaos, now known as West Virginia Alliance FC, and the Michigan Bucks, now known as the Flint City Bucks. He made a total of 17 appearances for the Chaos, while making a further 9 appearances for the Bucks.

Union Omaha
On March 2, 2020, it was announced that Osumanu had signed with Union Omaha and would begin his professional career with the club. After joining the club prior to the 2020 season, Osumanu made his debut for the club on 25 July 2020 against New England Revolution II.

Osumanu was a key contributor in Omaha's inaugural season, playing in 15 out of a 16 possible matches for the club. He started 14 of these matches helping the club to the 2020 USL League One Championship game, however, this match was cancelled due to a COVID-19 outbreak among Omaha's team. On December 3, 2020, Omaha announced that Osumanu would remain with the club for the 2021 USL League One season.

Career statistics

Personal
On 2 June 2021, Osumanu was named among nine people in an indictment charging them with defrauding 200 people out of at least $2.5 million. Osumanu was charged with six counts; two mail fraud charges, two wire-fraud charges, one money-laundering charge, and a charge of receiving stolen money. Osumanu is alleged to have “participated in a series of romance and other online scams designed to coerce vulnerable victims into sending money to various bank accounts controlled by them".

References

External links
Illal Osumanu at Marshall University Athletics

1996 births
Living people
Union Omaha players
USL League Two players
USL League One players
Association football defenders
Ghanaian expatriate footballers
Ghanaian footballers
Footballers from Accra
Charleston Golden Eagles men's soccer players
Marshall Thundering Herd men's soccer players
Ghanaian expatriate sportspeople in the United States
Expatriate soccer players in the United States
Flint City Bucks players
West Virginia Chaos players